is a Japanese shōjo manga artist.

Career 
In the beginning of her career, she published mainly in the manga magazine Margaret, where she debuted in 1979 at age 15 with Maggie. In 1993, her high school romance Pops was adapted as an OVA by Madhouse. Until the end of the 1990s, she was an exclusive artist for Bessatsu Margaret. She received the 2000 Shogakukan Manga Award for shōjo for the series Barairo no Ashita ("Rose-Colored Tomorrow"), which she created for the magazine.

In 1998, she decided to also do freelance work for other magazines than Bessatsu Margaret. She published a short story in the newly-founded Cookie magazine. She created the series Kiyoku Yawaku for the magazine, which won her the 2009 Kodansha Manga Award for shōjo. In 2013, Kiyoku Yawaku was adapted into a live-action film starring Masami Nagasawa and Masaki Okada. Ikuemi drew the cover art for Kazuyoshi Saito's October 2013 single "Kagerō", which was the film's theme song.

References

External links
 

Women manga artists
Manga artists from Hokkaido
Winner of Kodansha Manga Award (Shōjo)
Japanese female comics artists
Female comics writers
Living people
1964 births
Japanese women writers